Joseph J. Lilley (August 16, 1913 – January 1, 1971) was an American composer, songwriter and orchestrator. He worked for Paramount Studios from 1943 and was involved in many of the studio's successful musicals. Lilley was nominated at the 32nd Academy Awards for Li'l Abner in Best Musical Score.

Filmography
Content in this edit is translated from the existing French Wikipedia article at fr:Joseph J. Lilley; see its history for attribution.
1942: Holiday Inn (vocal arrangements)
1942: True to the Army (music: "Jingle Jangle Jingle" - uncredited)
1942: The Forest Rangers (music: "Jingle Jangle Jingle")
1942: Star Spangled Rhythm (vocal arranger)
1943: Dixie (vocal arranger)
1944: Rainbow Island (vocal arranger)
1944: Hail the Conquering Hero (composer: stock music - uncredited)
1947: Variety Girl (musical director)
1949: Dear Wife (composer: incidental music)
1949: The Great Lover (music)
1950: At War with the Army (musical director) 
1950: Mr. Music (musical director)
1951: Here Comes the Groom (music director) / (vocal arranger) 
1951: The Mating Season (music)
1952: Road to Bali (musical director)
1952: Sailor Beware (music director)
1953: The Stooge (musical director)
1953: The Caddy (musical director)
1954: White Christmas (music director) / (vocal arranger)
1954: Red Garters (musical director) / (vocal adaptor)
1955: The Seven Little Foys (conductor)
1956: That Certain Feeling (music)
1958: Paris Holiday (score)
1959: Li'l Abner (music)
1960: G.I. Blues (musical director)
1961: Blue Hawaii (musical director)
1962: Girls! Girls! Girls! (musical director)
1963: Papa's Delicate Condition (conductor)
1963: Fun in Acapulco (musical director)
1963: Who's Minding the Store? (musical director)
1964: Roustabout (musical director)
1964: The Disorderly Orderly (musical director)
1966: Paradise, Hawaiian Style (musical director)
1967: Easy Come, Easy Go (musical director)
1969: How to Commit Marriage (musical director)

Songwriter
Lilley collaborated on a number of songs, the most successful of which was "(I've Got Spurs That) Jingle Jangle Jingle" written with Frank Loesser. This was a huge hit for Kay Kyser in 1942.

References

External links
 

1913 births
1971 deaths
20th-century American composers
20th-century American male musicians
American film score composers
American music arrangers
Juilliard School alumni
American male film score composers
Musicians from Providence, Rhode Island
New England Conservatory alumni